During the 1996–97 English football season, Shrewsbury Town F.C. competed in the Football League Second Division.

Season summary
In the 1996–97 season, Shrewsbury endured a poor campaign and were relegated to the Third Division which ultimately cost manager Davies his job.

Final league table

 Pld = Matches ; W = Matches won; D = Matches drawn; L = Matches lost; F = Goals for; A = Goals against; GD = Goal difference; Pts = Points
 NB: In the Football League goals scored (F) takes precedence over goal difference (GD).

Results
Shrewsbury Town's score comes first

Legend

Football League Second Division

FA Cup

League Cup

Football League Trophy

Squad

References

Shrewsbury Town F.C. seasons
Shrewsbury Town